The City of Knox is a local government area in Victoria, Australia in the eastern suburbs of Melbourne. This municipality is one of only a handful that survived the widespread municipal amalgamations that occurred in Victoria in the early 1990s.

History

The City of Knox was named after Sir George Hodges Knox (1885–1960), a former soldier and speaker of the Victorian Legislative Assembly. The City of Knox Crest incorporates his family's motto 'Move and Prosper'.

The area which is now Knox was once part of the Scoresby Riding of the Shire of Berwick. On 23 May 1889, the riding was severed to create the Shire of Fern Tree Gully, which extended as far east as Olinda and Monbulk in the Dandenong Ranges. Post-World War II development in the area closer to Melbourne led to rapid urbanisation and population growth—over 21,000 residents lived in the Knox area by the 1961 Census. A plebiscite to determine local residents' views led to the creation of the Shire of Knox on 9 October 1963, which was proclaimed on 16 November 1963 by the Governor of Victoria. It was declared a City on 4 July 1969. By the 1986 Census, the area was home to over 100,000 residents.

On 15 December 1994, the City of Knox was one of the few councils (and one of only four in Melbourne) to survive the statewide amalgamation and its boundaries extended to add the suburb of Upper Ferntree Gully and part of Lysterfield from the former Shire of Sherbrooke.

Council

The council, as of November 2022, is:

Wards

At present, the City of Knox has nine wards, each electing one councillor for a period of four years.

 Baird Ward
 Chandler Ward
 Collier Ward
 Dinsdale Ward
 Dobson Ward
 Friberg Ward
 Scott Ward
 Taylor Ward
 Tirhatuan Ward

Prior to 1994, the Council had three wards, each of which elected three councillors:
 Bayswater/Wantirna Ward
 Boronia Ward
 Rowville/Scoresby Ward

Townships and localities
The 2021 census, the city had a population of 159,103 up from 154,110 in the 2016 census

^ - Territory divided with another LGA

Population

Religion

CityLife Church – CityLife Church Weblink
Hills Bible Church- Hills Bible Church is a Reformed Baptist congregation  
Knox Community Baptist Church
St. Jude's Parish, Scoresby
Knox Presbyterian Church
Our Saviours Lutheran Church
Our Lady of Lourdes Catholic Church
The Church of Jesus Christ of Latter-day Saints
The Salvation Army
Truth and Liberation Concern
St.Thomas Anglican Church Upper Ferntree Gully

Transport
There are a number of bus routes that service the city run by Ventura Bus Lines the city has 4 train stations that are run by Metro Melbourne.

See also
List of places on the Victorian Heritage Register in the City of Knox

References

External links
 
Knox City Council – Official website
Knox Historical Society Inc.
Link to Land Victoria interactive maps
City of Knox Community Profile
Public Transport Victoria local public transport map

Local government areas of Melbourne
Greater Melbourne (region)